Nkabinde is a South African surname that may refer to
Bess Nkabinde (born 1959), South African judge 
Gwen Mahlangu-Nkabinde (born 1955), South African politician 
Mahlathini (Simon Nkabinde; 1938–1999), South African mbaqanga singer 
Nkunzi Nkabinde (born 1975), South African sangoma, author, and LGBT activist
Themba Nkabinde, South African Army General